Potamophloios is a genus of freshwater sponges within the family Potamolepidae.

Species 

 †Potamophloios canadensis 
 Potamophloios gilberti 
 Potamophloios guairensis 
 Potamophloios hispida 
 Potamophloios songoloensis 
 Potamophloios stendelli 
 Potamophloios symoensi

References 

Sponge genera
Heteroscleromorpha